Electric Light is the second studio album by British singer-songwriter James Bay. The album was released on 18 May 2018 through Republic Records.

Background
On 7 March 2018, Bay announced that his second album was called Electric Light and would be released on 18 May 2018. In a press release, he said: "If I had to describe my first album visually it would probably be a flame – while this new album is about a real sonic and artistic evolution for me. The feeling of a 100 watt bulb expanding and brightening is what I envisioned. Electric Light came to my mind and I knew it was perfect."

Critical reception

At Metacritic, which assigns a normalised rating out of 100 to reviews from mainstream critics, the album has an average score of 71 based on 13 ratings, indicating "generally favorable reviews". Jordan Bassett of NME stated "'Electric Light' is all over the place. There are hip-hop style spoken-word skits on the record and, actually, it sometimes sounds more like a lush, exploratory mixtape than a coherent album." He rated the album 3/5. Q magazine was quoted as saying the album contains "an admirable desire for transformation." Stereogum wrote "It’s a genuinely thrilling piece of work, one that converted me into a James Bay fan on impact."

Track listing

Notes
  signifies a co-producer
  signifies an additional producer

Charts

Certifications

References

2018 albums
James Bay (singer) albums